David H. Miller Tobacco Warehouse is a historic tobacco warehouse located at Lancaster, Lancaster County, Pennsylvania. It was built in 1900, and is a three-story, rectangular red brick building on a stone foundation.  It is six bays by nine bays and has a slightly pitched gable roof.  It housed local tobacco companies until occupied by the Lorillard Tobacco Company after 1938.

It was listed on the National Register of Historic Places in 1990.

References

Industrial buildings and structures on the National Register of Historic Places in Pennsylvania
Industrial buildings completed in 1900
Buildings and structures in Lancaster, Pennsylvania
Lorillard Tobacco Company
Tobacco buildings in the United States
National Register of Historic Places in Lancaster, Pennsylvania
1900 establishments in Pennsylvania